East Law is a village in County Durham, in England. It is situated to the north of Consett, near Ebchester.

References

External links

Villages in County Durham